The 53rd Pennsylvania House of Representatives District is located in southeast Pennsylvania and has been represented by Steve Malagari since 2019.

District profile
The 53rd District is located in Montgomery County and includes the following areas:

 Franconia Township (part)
Precinct 02 
Precinct 05 
Precinct 08
 Hatfield
 Hatfield Township
 Lansdale
Montgomery Township (part)
District 01
District 02 
District 03
 Souderton
 Telford (Montgomery County portion)

Representatives

References

Government of Montgomery County, Pennsylvania
53